The Federal Rules of Appellate Procedure (officially abbreviated Fed. R. App. P.; colloquially FRAP) are a set of rules, promulgated by the Supreme Court of the United States on recommendation of an advisory committee, to govern procedures in cases in the United States Courts of Appeals. 

The Federal Rules of Appellate Procedure were originally adopted in 1967 and have been amended regularly since then.  Prior to 1967, some aspects of appellate procedure were covered in the Federal Rules of Civil Procedure.  

In addition to these rules, procedure in the Courts of Appeals is governed by applicable statutes (particularly Title 28 of the United States Code) and by local rules adopted by each individual court. Many of these local rules incorporate Federal Rules of Appellate Procedure by reference.

External links
 Federal Rules of Appellate Procedure Mobile-friendly edition of the rules
 Federal Rules of Appellate Procedure from the Legal Information Institute

United States appellate procedure
Legal codes
Federal judiciary of the United States